David Markish, is an Israeli prose writer, poet and translator who writes predominantly in Russian.

Life
David Markish was born in 1938 in Moscow, the Soviet Union to the famous Jewish poet Peretz Markish (1895-1952), murdered in the case of the Jewish Anti-Fascist Committee, mother – writer Esther Efimovna Lazebnikova-Markish (1912-2010), older brother – Shimon Markish (1931-2003) – professor at the University of Geneva, half-sister ceramic sculptor (1929-2012).

In January 1953, the Peretz Markish family was arrested and exiled to Kazakhstan Kzyl-Orda. In 1954, he returned to Moscow with his family. He studied at the Literary Institute named after Maksim Gorky (1957-1962) and at the Higher Courses of scriptwriters and film directors in Moscow (1967-1968). In 1972 he repatriated to Israel and participated in the Yom Kippur War (1973). He lives in Or Yehuda.

Twelve of David's novels were published in Russian, most were translated into other languages and published in the USA, United Kingdom, Germany, France, Switzerland, Sweden, and Brazil. He has been awarded many international literary prizes, including the Ukrainian Literary Prize, the British Book League Prize and the Ivan Machabeli Georgian Literary Prize. David was a Chairman of the Union of Russian-Speaking Writers of Israel (1982–85) and the President of the Israel Association of Creative Intelligentsia (since 2000).

Selected works 
 Five close to the sky, Leningrad, Hydrometeoizdat, 1966
 Trilogy “A New World for Simon Ashkenazy"):
 Story Embellishment. Tel Aviv, 1978 (a novel about Kazakhstan exile)
 Pure field, 1978
 Life on the doorstep, 1978
 Here and there (in Hebrew), Tel Aviv, 1978
 The cock, 1980 (a novel about a Soviet poet)
 Forward, 1980
 Jesters, Tel Aviv, 1983 (a historical novel about Jews in the court of Peter the Great), published in Russian, 1986, in English, 1988, by Henry Holt & Company
 In the Shadow of a Big Stone, published in Hebrew, 1982 and Russian, 1986
 Sugar kennel, 1984
 The Dog, Tel Aviv, 1984 (a novel about a Russian immigrant in the West)
 After me, Tel Aviv, 1984
 The Donor, Tel Aviv, 1987
 Polyushko Pole, New York, 1988 (a novel about the Civil War)
 The Field, 1889
 The Garnet Shaft, Tel Aviv, 1990
 My Enemy Cat, 1991
 To Be Like Others, novel, published by The Banner, 2000
 The Jew of Peter the Great, or the Chronicle from the life of passers-by, Novel. – St. Petersburg: "Limbus Press", 2001.
 To Become Lyutov, St. Petersburg, Limbus-press, 2001 (a novel about Isaac Babel)
 White circle, novel, Moscow, Isografus, 2004
 White circle, novel, Orenburg: Publishing house "Orenburg book", 2013, Ill. S. Kalmykova.
 Tubplier, novel, Moscow, Text, 2012
 White heat, Orenburg Book Publishing House named after G.P. Donkovtseva, 2019.
 MAHATMA. The Savior Mankind Never Knew (Translated by Marian Schwartz), a biographical novel about great scientist Waldemar Haffkine, Mahatma Haffkine Foundation, Aleksandr Duel, New-York, 2019

Awards 
 Seven Israeli literary prizes
 British Book League Award
 International Literary Prize of Ukraine
 Ivan Machabeli Prize | Georgian Literary Prize named after Ivan Machabeli

References

External links

The YIVO Encyclopedia

Jewish dramatists and playwrights
Soviet rehabilitations
20th-century Russian writers
1938 births
Jewish writers
Russian Sephardi Jews
Soviet writers
Jewish Russian and Soviet history
Living people